KICD-FM (107.7 MHz) is a radio station licensed to serve the community of Spencer, Iowa.  The station broadcasts a country music format.  KICD is licensed to Saga Communications of Iowa, LLC.

The studio, transmitter and broadcast tower are located on the north side of Spencer along   U.S. Route 71. The tower is also used by its sister station KICD (AM).

References

External links

Spencer, Iowa
ICD
Country radio stations in the United States
Radio stations established in 1983